The Hanifa Mosque is a mosque in Nadroga-Navosa Province, Fiji.

History
The mosque was opened on 10 April 2021 after being constructed at a cost of $1 million for a period of one year. It was financed and founded by Bobby Khan, and the mosque was named after Khan's mother, Hanifa Begum. The land where the mosque stands today was donated and built by Western Home Limited. The opening ceremony was officiated by Commerce, Trade, Tourism and Transport Minister Faiyaz Koya.

See also
 Islam in Fiji

References

2021 establishments in Fiji
Mosques completed in 2021
Mosques in Fiji
Nadroga-Navosa Province